Samuel Asamoah (born 23 March 1994) is a Togolese footballer who plays as a midfielder for Romanian Liga I club FC U Craiova 1948 and the Togo national team.

During the 2015–16 season, Asamoah was loaned to OH Leuven from Eupen. After the loan he returned to Eupen but was deemed surplus, leaving the team after the 2016–17 season for Sint-Truiden where he stayed for four seasons.

Personal life
Asamoah was born in Accra to a Togolese mother and Ghanaian father.

International career
Asamoah was eligible for both Togo and Ghana national sides at international level. He made his debut for Togo on 3 June 2022 in a match against Eswatini

International stats

References

External links
 Samuel Asamoah at ghanaweb.com
 
 

1994 births
Living people
Citizens of Togo through descent
Togolese footballers
Association football midfielders
Aspire Academy (Senegal) players
K.A.S. Eupen players
Oud-Heverlee Leuven players
Sint-Truidense V.V. players
FC U Craiova 1948 players
Belgian Pro League players
Challenger Pro League players
Liga I players
Togo international footballers
Togolese expatriate footballers
Togolese expatriate sportspeople in Senegal
Expatriate footballers in Senegal
Togolese expatriate sportspeople in Belgium
Expatriate footballers in Belgium
Togolese expatriate sportspeople in Romania
Expatriate footballers in Romania
Togolese people of Ghanaian descent
Sportspeople of Ghanaian descent
Footballers from Accra
Ghanaian footballers
Ghanaian expatriate footballers
Ghanaian expatriate sportspeople in Belgium
Ghanaian expatriate sportspeople in Romania
Ghanaian people of Togolese descent
Sportspeople of Togolese descent